Vanose Lake (also spelled Vanoss Lake) is a lake in Mahnomen County, in the U.S. state of Minnesota.

The lake was named for Francis Vanoss, an early settler.

See also
List of lakes in Minnesota

References

Lakes of Minnesota
Lakes of Mahnomen County, Minnesota